Macrozamia humilis is a species of plant in the family Zamiaceae. It is endemic to Inverell in New South Wales, Australia.  Its natural habitat is on granite soils in temperate shrubby woodland forests.

Sources

humilis
Endemic flora of Australia
Flora of New South Wales
Cycadophyta of Australia
Vulnerable flora of Australia
Taxonomy articles created by Polbot